Nuria Bages ( born Nuria Bages Romo on December 23, 1950) is a Mexican actress better known for her work in television and the stage.

Active in Mexican television since the early 1980s, Bages became a household name after winning the role of Silvina in the long-running sitcom Dr. Cándido Pérez, opposite Jorge Ortiz de Pinedo. With the married Pinedo she had long and tumultuous sentimental relationship that ended after the show went off the air.

In 1993 she resumed her career in telenovelas playing María Inés in Los parientes probres and has remained active since.

Filmography

Films

Television

Awards and nominations

Premios TVyNovelas

References

External links

 Nuria Bages at the Mexican Telenovela Database

1953 births
Living people
Mexican telenovela actresses
Mexican television actresses
Mexican film actresses
Mexican stage actresses
20th-century Mexican actresses
21st-century Mexican actresses
Actresses from Monterrey